"Body Groove" is the debut single of English UK garage group Architechs, featuring vocals from Nana. Released on 25 September 2000, the song was a success, peaking at number three on the UK Singles Chart and becoming a moderate hit in Belgium, Iceland, and the Netherlands.

Track listings
UK CD and 12-inch single; European CD single
 "Body Groove" (original mix MC version) – 5:13
 "Body Groove" (Drive Time mix) – 5:35
 "Body Groove" (Zed Bias dub mix) – 5:52

UK cassette single
 "Body Groove" (original mix MC version) – 5:13
 "Body Groove" (Zed Bias dub mix) – 5:52

Charts

Weekly charts

Year-end charts

Certifications

Covers and samples

In 2019, DJ Spoony together with Katie Chatburn and the Ignition Orchestra featuring Nay Nay and Ms Banks on vocals recorded an orchestral version of the song for the UK garage covers album Garage Classical. In 2020, Dizzee Rascal sampled the intro of "Body Groove" throughout his song "Body Loose".

References

2000 songs
2000 debut singles
Go! Beat singles
UK garage songs